Love at First Sight is a 1977 Canadian romantic comedy film directed by Rex Bromfield,

Synopsis
Love at First Sight is a romantic comedy about a young woman, Shirley (Mary Ann McDonald), and a clumsy blind man named Roy (Dan Aykroyd). The pair flees to Niagara Falls to open a restaurant when Shirley's controlling and unpleasant father Frank (George Murray) objects to their relationship.

Reception
The film was critically panned at the time. Aykroyd was still with Saturday Night Live at the time the picture was made and this is his first film.
The theme song was "Do You Believe in Love at First Sight" written by Ron Roker, Gerry Shury, Chris Rea and Frank McDonald and recorded by Dionne Warwick.  The song had been performed a year earlier by Polly Brown.

See also
 Love at first sight

References

External links 
 
 

1977 films
1977 romantic comedy films
Canadian romantic comedy films
English-language Canadian films
Films directed by Rex Bromfield
1977 directorial debut films
1970s English-language films
1970s Canadian films